ECC may refer to:

Education
 ECC (eikaiwa), a Japanese English teaching company
 Eastern Christian College, in Bel Air, Maryland, United States; defunct
 El Camino College, in Alondra Park, California, United States
 Elgin Community College, in Illinois, United States
 Erie Community College, in Williamsville, New York, United States
 Essex County College, in New Jersey, United States
 Eveland Christian College, in San Mateo, Isabela
 Ewing Christian College, in Allahabad, Uttar Pradesh, India

Government and politics 
 Economic Coordination Committee (Pakistan), of the Government of Pakistan
 End Conscription Campaign, a former South African anti-apartheid organization
 European civil code
 European Commodity Clearing, the energy clearing house for the European Energy Exchange
 Electronic Communications Committee of the European Conference of Postal and Telecommunications Administrations
 Electronic Communications Convention, a treaty aiming at facilitating the use of electronic communications in international trade
 European Cryptologic Center of the United States National Security Agency
 European Economic Community, one of the three European Communities that existed from 1958 until 2009

Music
 Eastern Conference Champions, an American indie rock band
 Eugene Concert Choir, an American choir
 The Evolution Control Committee, an American experimental music band

Religion
 Ecclesiastes, a book of the Hebrew Bible
 Ecumenical Catholic Church, US
 Ecumenical Catholic Communion, US
 Ecumenical Christian Centre, in Bengaluru, India
 Evangelical Covenant Church, North America

Sports
 East Central Conference (IHSAA), an athletic conference from 1947 to 1969 in Eastern Indiana
 East Coast Conference (Division I), a former US NCAA Division I athletics conference
 East Coast Conference, a US NCAA Division II athletics conference
 ECC Antwerp, an indoor tennis tournament
 European Challenge Cup, a rugby union competition
 European Champions Cup (disambiguation)
 European Cricket Council, an international body in cricket

Science and technology 
 3,4-Epoxycyclohexylmethyl-3’,4’-epoxycyclohexane carboxylate, a resin with industrial applications
 Early childhood caries, a tooth disease in children
 ECC memory, a type of computer data storage 
 Elliptic-curve cryptography, a public key cryptography algorithm
 Endocervical curettage, a medical procedure
 Engineered cementitious composite, a.k.a. bendable concrete
 Error correction code
 Exchange coupled composite media
 SAP ECC, enterprise resource planning software

Transport 
 Crossair Europe, a defunct French airline
 Eccles railway station, Manchester, England (National Rail station code)
 Electric Car Corporation, a British seller of electric cars
 Volvo ECC, a concept car
 A class designation for Reading electric multiple units

Other uses 
 Electronic Check Council, an American industry association
 English China Clays, an English mining company
 Emergency control centre, or emergency communications centre

See also

 EC (disambiguation)
 Eck (disambiguation)
 Ekk (disambiguation)
 EK (disambiguation)
 EQ (disambiguation)